Anil K. Rajvanshi is an academic from India, and is the current Director of the Nimbkar Agricultural Research Institute (NARI).

Rajvanshi was born and raised in Lucknow, India.  He has been the director of NARI at Maharashtra, India since 1981.  Prior to taking this position he served on the faculty at the University of Florida. Dr. Rajvanshi has more than 35 years of experience in renewable energy research, rural and sustainable development. He has more than 150 publications and 7 patents to his credit.

Rajvanshi has been inducted into the Solar Hall of Fame (1998). He has received the Jamnalal Bajaj Award in 2001, the Federation of Indian Chamber of Commerce and Industry (FICCI) award in 2002 and an Energy Globe Award in the AIR category in 2004. In 2009 he received the Globe Award for Sustainability Research. and in 2014 he became the first Indian to receive the Distinguished Alumnus Award from University of Florida. Recently he has been given the Distinguished Alumnus Award of Indian Institute of Technology Kanpur. In 2022 he was given one of the highest civilian award of India Padma Shri.

Education
 Indian School Certificate St. Francis' College, Lucknow in 1966
 Bachelor's degree from the Indian Institute of Technology, Kanpur in 1972.
 Master's degree from the Indian Institute of Technology, Kanpur in 1974.
 Doctorate in Mechanical Engineering from the University of Florida, USA in 1979.

Books and writings
 1970s America - an Indian Student's Journey
 Nature of Human Thought
 Romance of Innovation - A human interest story of doing R&D in rural setting
A Life of an ordinary Indian - An exercise in self-importance
Exploring the Mind of God  

Rajvanshi is a regular blogger for Times of India (Speaking Tree), Huffington Post, Thrive Global and South Asia Monitor. He is also a regular podcaster.

See also
 List of Indian writers

References

External links
 Dr. Rajvanshi's Official Bio

Living people
University of Florida faculty
University of Florida College of Engineering alumni
IIT Kanpur alumni
Scientists from Lucknow
Sustainability advocates
HuffPost writers and columnists
Indian spiritual writers
Engineers from Maharashtra
1950 births
Indian autobiographers
Indian bloggers
20th-century Indian biographers
New_Age_writers
Indian_podcasters
Scientists_from_Maharashtra
21st-century_Indian_writers
People_from_Lucknow
Recipients_of_the_Padma_Shri_in_science_%26_engineering